Enzo D'Alò  (born 7 September 1953) is an Italian animator and director.

Life and career 
Born in Naples, D'Alò moved to Turin in 1979 and there he started his career as animator working with the group "La Lanterna Magica". In 1983 he debuted as director of animated shorts, and in 1991 he was chosen to direct the TV-series Pimpa, based on the comic character with the same name. After his feature film debut with La freccia azzurra, D'Alò got a large audience success and critical acclaim with his second work, Lucky and Zorba.

Filmography 
Pimpa (TV, 1991)
La freccia azzurra (1996)
Lucky and Zorba (1998)
Momo (2001)
Opopomoz (2003)
Pinocchio (2013)
Pipì Pupù e Rosmarina (TV, 2009; 2014–present)
The Chip Maker (2015)

References

External links 
 

1953 births
Italian film directors
Italian animated film directors
Film people from Naples
Living people
Italian animators